Warbonnet Peak can refer to two mountains in the United States:

Warbonnet Peak (Idaho), in Boise County
Warbonnet Peak (Wyoming), in Converse County

See also
 War Bonnet Peak, Wyoming

References